Ludwell Harrison Johnson III (March 30, 1927 – June 5, 2017) was a professor of history at the College of William and Mary. His main expertise was the American Civil War, with a focus on the political and economic motives of those who sought independence in the form of a new Confederacy.

Johnson was born in 1927 in Charleston, West Virginia. He was raised in Richmond, Virginia.  He served in the Naval Reserve from 1945-1946 and received his Ph.D. from Johns Hopkins University in 1955. In November, 1996, Johnson was diagnosed with a rare form of bone cancer.

Johnson died on June 5, 2017 in Williamsburg, VA at the age of 90.

Bibliography 
 Johnson, Ludwell H. (1958). Red River Campaign: Politics and Cotton in the Civil War. Johns Hopkins Press. .
 Johnson, Ludwell H. (1978). Division and Reunion: America, 1848–1877. John Wiley & Sons. , .
 Republished as North Against South: The American Iliad, 1848–1877. Foundation for American Education. , .

Sources
biographical note on article by Johnson
Daily Press News Article

References 

Writers from Richmond, Virginia
Johns Hopkins University alumni
College of William & Mary faculty
1927 births
2017 deaths
21st-century American historians
21st-century American male writers
Historians from Virginia
American male non-fiction writers